"Don't Stop 'Til You Get Enough" is a single written and recorded by American singer Michael Jackson. Released under Epic Records on July 10, 1979, the song is the first track on Jackson's fifth studio album Off the Wall (1979). It was the first solo recording over which Jackson had creative control.

"Don't Stop 'Til You Get Enough" was Jackson's second single to hit number one on the Billboard Hot 100 chart following "Ben" and his first solo number-one hit on the Billboard Soul Singles chart. It remained at number one for six weeks on Billboard Soul Singles chart. It is certified 5× Platinum by the Recording Industry Association of America (RIAA). The song was also worldwide success, reaching number one in nine other countries. "Don't Stop 'Til You Get Enough" was well received by contemporary music critics and is widely regarded as one of the greatest and most iconic disco songs of all time.

An accompanying music video for "Don't Stop 'Til You Get Enough" was released in October 1979. The video shows Jackson dancing, as well as being shown in an innovative triplicate, in different color backgrounds. The song also won Jackson his first Grammy Award and American Music Awards.

Background and production
In 1978, Jackson starred as the Scarecrow in The Wiz, an urbanized retelling of L. Frank Baum's The Wonderful Wizard of Oz. After the filming, Jackson, who was still a member of The Jacksons, approached the film's musical director, Quincy Jones, to ask if he knew of any producers to help with Jackson's future solo endeavors. Jones suggested himself, and the two began work on Off the Wall. After listening to hundreds of demos, the two decided upon the ones to record. These included "Workin' Day and Night", "Get on the Floor" and "Don't Stop 'Til You Get Enough". The song was recorded in Los Angeles. Jackson claimed that when the melody of "Don't Stop 'Til You Get Enough" came to him, he couldn't shake it off. He found himself humming and singing it while walking through the Jacksons' Encino home. As Michael was not a keyboardist, although certainly capable of playing piano, he had his brother Randy perform the melody on a piano in the family's recording studio. When Jackson's mother, Katherine Jackson, a devout Jehovah's Witness, heard the song, she was shocked by the lyrical content and felt that the title could be misconstrued as pertaining to sexual activity. Jackson reassured her that the song was not a reference to sex, but could mean whatever people wanted it to. Upon playing the recording to Jones, it was agreed that the song would be featured on Off the Wall.

In a speech at the 2016 Red Bull Music Academy, Greg Phillinganes alleged that Jackson played him an early demo of "Don't Stop 'Til You Get Enough" and said "it needs another part," after which Phillinganes suggested the bridge, and the two agreed to rate his contribution at 10% of the song. Soon thereafter, however, he was informed that his contribution would be considered merely an arrangement. Nevertheless, many pressings of the single list both Jackson and Phillinganes as composers. Quincy Jones has backed Phillinganes' allegation.

Composition
"Don't Stop 'Til You Get Enough" is the first solo song written by Michael Jackson, although "Blues Away" had been released in 1976.

Musically, it is credited as a disco-funk song. The song's full length on Off The Wall is just over six minutes. The song introduced Jackson's falsetto voice and vocal hiccups, which would become one of Jackson's signature techniques. Along with Jackson's vocal hiccups, Jackson's voice in the song was described as having vocal tics—from the hiccups, a "grunt", and "the 'oho!'". "Don't Stop 'Til You Get Enough" is played in the key of B Mixolydian and in common time signature and Jackson's voice range is from G3 to B5. Instruments used are a six-piece horn section (two trumpets, alto sax, tenor sax, trombone, and baritone sax), string section (arranged by Ben Wright), and two guitars, keyboards, bass, drums and percussion. The song's tempo is upbeat at 120 beats per minute. The song begins with a spoken word section by Jackson before he bursts into singing.

Release and reception
"Don’t Stop 'Til You Get Enough" was released on August 10, 1979, under Epic Records; Jackson's first solo single away from Motown Records. It was well received by contemporary critics. Stephen Holden, of Rolling Stone, described the song as "one of a handful of recent disco releases that works both as a dance track and as an aural extravaganza comparable to Earth, Wind and Fire's 'Boogie Wonderland'". Cash Box described it as having "a zesty, infectious disco rhythm," a "funky hook line," "buzzing electronic keyboard work and bright horns."  The song topped the Billboard Hot 100 on October 13, and within three months of its release, it had been certified gold. It was Jackson's first solo number one single since "Ben", seven years prior. It remained atop of the Billboard Hot 100 for one week. It also reached the top of the charts in Australia, New Zealand, Norway and South Africa, and peaked at number three in the United Kingdom. "Don't Stop 'Til You Get Enough" was awarded platinum certification by the Recording Industry Association of America in 1989.

In 2006, "Don't Stop 'Til You Get Enough" reached number 17 in the United Kingdom, following the Visionary campaign, whereby 20 of Jackson's hit singles were reissued in several European countries. Following Jackson's death in June 2009, his music saw an increase in popularity. "Don't Stop 'Til You Get Enough" peaked at number seven on Billboard'''s Hot Digital Songs Chart, peaking at number nine on the charts issue date July 11, 2009. "Don't Stop 'Til You Get Enough" charted within the top ten, placing at number nine, in France, and charted within the top 20 in Italy, Portugal and Switzerland, placing at number 16, 18 and 20. The song also charted at number 21 in Australia, 38 in the United Kingdom, and 50 in Sweden, respectively. "Don't Stop 'Til You Get Enough"s least successful country was Japan, peaking at number 77.  "Don’t Stop 'Til You Get Enough" was certified platinum in Australia by CBS records Australia in 1980 (Epic's distributor in Australia) for the shipments of more than 100,000 units.

"Don't Stop 'Til You Get Enough" earned Jackson his first solo Grammy Award, winning Best Male R&B Vocal Performance at the 1980 Grammy Awards. It was also nominated for Best Disco Recording. The song also received Favorite Soul/R&B Single at the 1980 American Music Awards.

Music video

The music video for "Don't Stop 'Til You Get Enough" was directed and produced by Nick Saxton and made its world premiere in October 1979. It was Jackson's first music video as a solo artist. The music video shows a smiling Jackson in a black and white tuxedo with a black bow tie (resembling the Off The Wall album cover photo) dancing and singing the song while appearing chroma keyed over a background of abstract geometric figures. At one stage, Jackson is seen dancing in triplicate, which was considered innovative at the time.

The music video was included on the video albums: Video Greatest Hits - HIStory, Number Ones and Michael Jackson's Vision.

 Live performances 
Michael Jackson performed this song on The Jacksons' Destiny Tour on the second leg, as well as the Triumph Tour. An arrangement of the song was performed on Jackson's Bad World Tour as part of the "Bad Groove" interlude. It was also performed on Jackson's 96-97 HIStory World Tour as part of the "Off the Wall Medley" along with "Rock with You" and "Off the Wall". Jackson would have also performed it on the This Is It concert series as part of the "Off the Wall Medley", but the shows were canceled due to his sudden death.

Legacy
James Montgomery of MTV noted that "Don't Stop 'Til You Get Enough", along with Off the Wall's other three singles, "showcased (or, more specifically, unleashed) Jackson's talents as  entertainer, a vocalist, a writer and, most importantly, as a leading man." After Jackson's death, AOL's Radio Blog released a list, entitled "10 Best Michael Jackson Songs", which placed "Don't Stop 'Til You Get Enough" at number ten on the list. Rolling Stone and American Songwriter both ranked the song number three on their lists of the greatest Michael Jackson songs.

William Ruhlmann, author of The All-Music Guide to Rock, praised "Don't Stop 'Til You Get Enough" as an "irresistible dance track". John Lewis, author of 1001 Albums You Must Hear Before You Die, noted that the "jittery, frenetic opening track" is the centerpiece of Off the Wall. He concluded that "Jackson's falsetto hollers and frisky yelps serve as an obbligato to the lead line, punctuating Ben Wright's thrilling string arrangement and Jerry Hey's tight horn charts". Jason Elias, a writer for Allmusic, noted that "Don't Stop 'Til You Get Enough" presents a "new Michael Jackson" that was "sexual, adult, and aggressive. Elias commented that "Like the best of Jones' late-'70s, early-'80s work, this [song] wasn't quite disco, couldn't be hardcore funk - it was an amalgam of styles with the all-important pop accessibility."

Jackson's biographer J. Randy Taraborrelli described Jackson's vocal styling as a "sexy, playful falsetto" that "no one had ever heard from him before". Nelson George stated that the argument for Jackson's greatness began with the arrangements of "Don't Stop 'Til You Get Enough". He noted that the percussion and backing vocals were "artfully choreographed" to "create drama and ecstasy on the dance floor". He concluded, "It's one thing to make a dance record — it is another to instill that track with an epic, celebratory quality as Michael does here". James Montgomery of MTV noted that Off The Wall contained a "masterful mixture of fiery disco tracks", specifying "Don't Stop 'Til You Get Enough" and "Workin' Day and Night".

Track listing

European 7" single (EPC 7763)
A. "Don't Stop 'Til You Get Enough - 3:58
B. "I Can't Help It" - 4:29
			
Netherlands 12" single 
A. "Don't Stop 'Til You Get Enough - 5:53
B. "I Can't Help It" - 4:29
			
"Visionary" DualDisc single (82876725112)
CD side
 "Don't Stop 'Til You Get Enough" (7" Edit) - 3:58
 "Don't Stop 'Til You Get Enough" (12" Edit) - 5:53

DVD side
 "Don't Stop 'Til You Get Enough" (Video) - 4:11

Personnel

 Written and composed by Michael Jackson
 Produced by Quincy Jones
 Co-Produced by Michael Jackson
 Michael Jackson: Lead and background vocals
 Additional background vocals by Jim Gilstrap, Augie Johnson, Mortonette Jenkins, Paulette McWilliams and Zedric Wiliams
 Louis Johnson: Bass
 John Robinson: Drums
 Greg Phillinganes: Acoustic and electric pianos, synthesizers
 David Williams, Marlo Henderson: Guitars
 Michael Jackson, Randy Jackson, Richard Heath, Paulinho da Costa, Sheila E.: Percussion

 Horns arranged by Jerry Hey and performed by The Seawind Horns:
 Jerry Hey: Trumpet, flugelhorn
 Larry Williams: Tenor and alto saxophones, flute
 Kim Hutchcroft: Baritone and tenor saxophones, flute
 William Reichenbach: Trombone
 Gary Grant: Trumpet
 Rhythm arrangement by Greg Phillinganes and Michael Jackson
 Vocal and percussion arrangements by Michael Jackson
 String arrangement by Ben Wright
 Concert master: Gerald Vinci
 Recording Engineer and Mixing: Bruce Swedien

Charts
Weekly charts

Year-end charts

Certifications

References

Further reading
George, Nelson (2004). Michael Jackson: The Ultimate Collection'' booklet. Sony BMG.

External links

Songs about dancing
1979 singles
1979 songs
2006 singles
Billboard Hot 100 number-one singles
Cashbox number-one singles
CBS Records singles
Epic Records singles
American disco songs
Funk songs
Michael Jackson songs
Number-one singles in Australia
Number-one singles in New Zealand
Number-one singles in Norway
Number-one singles in South Africa
Song recordings produced by Michael Jackson
Song recordings produced by Quincy Jones
Songs written by Michael Jackson